Chris or Christopher Wilson may refer to:

Music
 Christopher Wilson (1874–1919), British composer
 Christopher Wilson (lutenist) (born 1951), British lutenist
 Chris Wilson (American musician) (born 1952), UK-based US-born musician
 Chris Wilson (Australian musician) (1956–2019), Australian blues musician

Sports
 Chris Wilson (fighter) (born 1977), American mixed martial arts fighter
 Chris Wilson (gridiron football) (born 1982), American football defensive end 
 Chris Wilson (American football coach) (born 1964), American football coach
 Chris Wilson (golfer) (born 1984), American professional golfer
 Chris Wilson (wrestler) (born 1967), Canadian Olympic wrestler

Other
 Christopher Wilson (bishop) (1714–1792), English bishop of Bristol
 Christopher Wilson (merchant) (1731–1804), English merchant and banker in Kendal
 Christopher Wilson (businessman) (1765–1845), English banker and political activist, son of Christopher Wilson I
 Christopher Wyndham Wilson (1844–1914), English landowner and agricultural pioneer
 Christopher Wilson (biographer) (born 1947), journalist and biographer
 Chris Wilson (Canadian politician)
 Christopher Wilson (British Army officer), British general
 J. Chris Wilson (born 1948), American Southern artist
 Chris Wilson (developer)
 Chris H. Wilson, businessman and politician in Utah Senate

See also
 Kris Wilson (disambiguation)